Donyi Polo Government College, Kamki, established in 1996, is a general degree college at Kamki, West Siang district, Arunachal Pradesh. It offers undergraduate courses in arts and commerce. It is affiliated to  Rajiv Gandhi University.

Departments

Arts and Commerce
Hindi
English
History
Political Science
Education
Geography
Economics
Commerce

Accreditation
The college is recognized by the University Grants Commission (UGC).

References

External links
https://dpgc.ac.in/

Colleges affiliated to Rajiv Gandhi University
Educational institutions established in 1996
Universities and colleges in Arunachal Pradesh
1996 establishments in Arunachal Pradesh